Gao Li may refer to:

 Kao Li or Gao Li, Chinese film director
 Gao Li (canoeist), Chinese canoeist

See also
 Li Gao (351–417), founding duke of the Western Liang state
 Goryeo (918–1392), Korean kingdom